The Mumbwa Caves are an archeological site in Zambia. The site has yielded artifacts that date from the Mesolithic, Neolithic and the Iron Age. The caves are a source of stratified, in situ deposits with faunal and human remains. Mumbwa, with its interior structures, demonstrates the complexity of the behavioral abilities of the people from the Mesolithic. Selection of raw materials along with features such as hearths suggests a population which was modern in its behaviors used to inhabit the Mumbwa Caves. Study and excavation of the Mumbwa Caves is helping to fill in the gaps in the late Pleistocene prehistory of south central Africa.

Excavations
Macrae 1926;  Clark 1942; Savage 1983.
In 1931, Dart and Del Grande excavated the caves and discovered intact basal deposits which were used to date the site.
In 1993, Lawrence Barham gathered a team represented by the Zambian National Heritage Conservation Commission, the Livingstone Museum and the Universities of Bristol and Oxford to assess the extent of intact basal deposits discovered by Dart and Del Grande.

Artifacts
A 62,614 lithics were recovered in 1994. 3,171 were from the Iron Age deposit, 16,939 from the LSA (Late Stone Age) and 40,060 from the upper MSA (Middle Stone Age) sequence. Several general patterns have been observed from these artifacts. It is evident that there are patterns within the raw materials used, the manipulation of manuports and in the production of bone tools. Hearths and windbreaks have been found at Mumbwa and are evidence of the emergence of complex Middle Stone Age behaviors being used by past people of Mumbwa. Windbreaks bend away from the tunnel and would have protected the occupants of the cave and their hearths from the east to west winds. Microfauna found at the site indicates dry conditions at the time of occupation.

Features
There are two main classes of features that can be found at the Mumbwa Caves site. Hearths and windbreaks are two features which are distinctive of the Mumbwa Middle Stone Age. The hearths found in Areas I and II, have stone borders consisting of cave dolomite blocks and material transported from local landscape, including quartz cobbles, phyllite, sandstone and cobbles of haematite. Area I contains one of the best preserved windbreaks on the Mumbwa Caves site. It is distinguished by a semi-circular arc of ash, sediment, quartz debitage and animal bone.

External links
 The Mumbwa Caves Project

References

Archaeological sites in Zambia
Archaeological sites of Eastern Africa